Alexandra "Lexie" Feeney (born 3 July 1989 in Penrith) is an athlete from Australia who competes in archery. She was an Australian Institute of Sport scholarship holder.

The 2005 Italian Grand Prix may well be the watershed competition for Australia's female archers. After qualifying strongly Lexie Feeney won through her first round match but found it a little tougher going in the next round against Frigeri(ITA) who was supported by the home crowd. Despite this Lexie showed great composure and maturity to come away with a good win. Lexie shot against Mospinek (POL) for the top prize, but despite her best efforts wasn't able to match it with the Pole. The final result saw Lexie win the silver medal and become the Australian Institute or Sport Archery Program's first female international medal.

At the 2008 Summer Olympics in Beijing Feeney finished her ranking round with a total of 580 points. This gave her the 59th seed for the final competition bracket in which she faced Yuan Shu-Chi in the first round. The archer from Chinese Taipei was too strong and won the confrontation with 104–101, eliminating Feeney straight away.

At the 2010 Commonwealth Games in Delhi Feeney finished her ranking round with a total of 625 points. Feeney progressed to the
quarter finals in which she faced Deepika Kumari the top ranked archery from India. Feeney's final ranking for the Games was 8th.

References

1989 births
Living people
Olympic archers of Australia
Archers at the 2008 Summer Olympics
Australian female archers
Australian Institute of Sport archers
People educated at Lake Ginninderra College
20th-century Australian women
21st-century Australian women